The Scott Irvin Chevrolet/Craftsman 200 was a NASCAR SuperTruck Series presented by Craftsman race held at Saugus Speedway in Santa Clarita, California on April 15, 1995. The third of 20 races in the series' inaugural season, it was run on the shortest track the series ever competed on; it was won by Winston Cup Series regular Ken Schrader.

Report
Pole position for the race was won by Mike Skinner, who was the fastest in qualifying for the second time in the series' three races to that point. Geoff Bodine qualified second, while Ken Schrader, P. J. Jones and Butch Miller filled out the top five qualifying spots. Twenty-six trucks attempted to qualify for the twenty-four truck starting grid; Pancho Carter and Mike Hurlbert failed to qualify for the event.

Held before a record crowd, the race was won by Ken Schrader, driving the No. 52 Chevrolet for Ken Schrader Racing; Schrader led 54 of the race's 200 laps, and won by 1.7 seconds over Geoff Bodine. Bill Sedgwick, Butch Miller and Mike Skinner completed the top five finishers, while Ron Hornaday Jr., Butch Gilliland, Tobey Butler, Rick Carelli and Bob Strait rounded out the top ten. Early in the race Schrader was penalized to the rear of the field for causing an accident involving Jones; Jerry Glanville was given a five-lap penalty late in the race for causing an accident involving then-leader Skinner.

Nine trucks finished on the lead lap; twelve caution flags slowed the event for 18 laps. One red-flag period for oil on the track stopped the race for 28 minutes. Only two of the 24 trucks that started the race failed to finish the event, the No. 30 of Mark Gibson dropping out of the race following an accident, while the No. 14 of John Kinder retired from the event due to driver fatigue.

Results

References

Scott Irvin Chevrolet/Craftsman 200
Scott Irvin Chevrolet/Craftsman 200
Scott Irvin Chevrolet/Craftsman 200
Former NASCAR races